George Hutchins Bingham (August 19, 1864 – September 25, 1949) was a United States circuit judge of the United States Court of Appeals for the First Circuit.

Education and career

Born on August 19, 1864, in Littleton, New Hampshire, Bingham received an Artium Baccalaureus degree in 1887 from Dartmouth College and a Bachelor of Laws in 1891 from Harvard Law School. He entered private practice in Littleton and Manchester, New Hampshire from 1891 to 1902. He was a Justice of the Supreme Court of New Hampshire from 1902 to 1913.

Federal judicial service

Bingham was nominated by President Woodrow Wilson on May 15, 1913, to a seat on the United States Court of Appeals for the First Circuit vacated by Judge LeBaron Bradford Colt. He was confirmed by the United States Senate on June 5, 1913, and received his commission the same day. He was a member of the Conference of Senior Circuit Judges (now the Judicial Conference of the United States) from 1922 to 1938. In 1933, he also served as president of the New Hampshire Bar Association. He assumed senior status on March 23, 1939. His service terminated on September 25, 1949, due to his death in Manchester.

References

Sources
 

1864 births
1949 deaths
Dartmouth College alumni
Harvard Law School alumni
Judges of the United States Court of Appeals for the First Circuit
United States court of appeals judges appointed by Woodrow Wilson
20th-century American judges
People from Littleton, New Hampshire